Mare Decendrii  is the second studio album by American post-rock band Mamiffer. It was released through SIGE records on March 15, 2011. The album was recorded at Studio Litho, Aleph Studio and London Bridge Studio in Seattle and mixed by Randall Dunn and Mell Dettmer. The album was mastered and produced by Mell Dettmer and Randall Dunn, respectively.

Release
Mare Decendrii was released via SIGE Records (CD) and Conspiracy Records (LP) on March 15, 2011. The album was the first to be released through SIGE records, a label founded by Turner and Coloccia specifically for projects they are directly involved in. Turner stated: "We feel that in many circumstances artists lose control of and perspective on the albums they release, and the SIGE was created in part to avoid this problem. We also both enjoy the process of making records from recording to design, all the way down to hand assembly. To have a label that operates in a more intimate a creatively focused way is a very gratifying and important endeavor for both of us."

Reception

Upon release the album gained generally favorable reviews. Invisible Oranges' Alee Karim described the album as “some of the most beautiful instrumental music I’ve heard in forever” admitting that prior to listening he lacked a “strong impression” of the band. Commenting on the production he stated that the “artsy and introspective moments sit nicely next to the more bombastic ones” defining the album as “the soundtrack for an Andrei Tarkovsky film with a Michael Bay budget.” Adam Rauf of Blow the Scene summarized the album as “a pensive and complex … with tons of layers and subtleties" as well as "a phenomenal effort with plenty of substance.” Eclectic music website Brainwashed described Mare Decendrii as “moody and complex” an album that “doesn’t fit into any specific genre” with a “cinematic feeling that conjures up a lot of feelings and images”. The Inarguable summed up the album as “an ethereal, otherworldly journey through distant lands, physical, Earthly or not.”

Track listing
Lyrics by Aaron Turner and Faith Coloccia.
 "As Freedom Rings"– 13:50
 "We Speak in the Dark" – 20:48
 "Blanket of Ash" – 5:25
 "Eating Our Bodies" – 12:32
 "Iron Water" – 8:06

Japanese edition bonus track
 "Dead Settlers" – 15:29

Personnel

Mamiffer
Aaron Turner – guitar, vocals, effects
Faith Coloccia – piano, vocals, synthesizer, samples, percussion

Production
Mamiffer – co-producer
Faith Coloccia – design
Aaron Turner – design
Shawn Simmons – engineering,
Mell Dettmer – engineering, mixing, mastering
Giséle Vienne – photography
Randall Dunn – producer, engineering, mixing

Additional musicians
Brian Cook – bass
Eyvind Kang – string arrangement, viola, violin
Aaron Harris – additional percussion
Randall Dunn – additional percussion
Travis Rommereim – additional percussion
Timba Harris – viola, violin
Moriah Neils – double bass
Don McGreevy – drums, tubular bells, percussion
Jessika Kenney – additional vocals
Joe Preston – additional vocals
Jussi Lehtisalo – additional vocals
Mika Rättö – additional vocals
Parvaneh Daneshvar – additional vocals
Sera Timms – additional vocals

References

2011 albums
Mamiffer albums